Eduardo Sánchez de Fuentes (3 April 1874, in Havana – 7 September 1944) was a Cuban composer, and an author of books on the history of Cuban folk music.

The outstanding habanera Tú, written when he was sixteen, was his best-known composition. As an adult, he composed the scores for the opera Yumurí, the ballet Dioné, the oratorio Navidad and the cantata Anacaona.

His writings are still charming and informative today, though their standing has suffered from an accurate criticism by later musicologists. They realized that he had systematically underestimated the contribution of the Africans in Cuba. He insisted, instead, on the supposed contribution of Cuba's original aboriginal population, which was subsequently disproved.
"It is a shame that a succession of errors should have spoilt the greatest work of a man who had carried his musicianship for almost half a century with rare dignity. Because in the end...Sanchez de Fuentes will remain, above all, a composer of habaneras and songs.  In a hundred years his Cuban melodies will occupy a place of honor in our traditions..."

His books 

El folklore en la música cubana
Cuba y sus músicos
Influencia de los ritmos africanos en nuestro cancionero
La contradanza y la habanera
Ignacio Cervantes
Consideraciones sobre la música cubana
Viejos ritmos cubanos
La última firma de Brindis de Sala
La música aborigen de América
Foklorismo

References

External links 
 

1874 births
1944 deaths
Contradanza
Cuban composers
Male composers
Cuban songwriters
Male songwriters
Cuban non-fiction writers
Cuban male writers
Male non-fiction writers
Cuban male musicians